The Leonard de Vinci Engineering School (ESILV) is an engineering school located in Paris, France. It is fully accredited to award the title of ingénieur by the French Commission of Engineering Titles. ESILV is part of the "Pôle universitaire Léonard-de-Vinci". The director of the school is Pascal Pinot.

It was placed 10th among French engineering schools "Post-bac" in the 2010 Le Point rankings.

Since 2022 the school became the Highest ranked private school after High School according to Usine Nouvelle, l'Etudiant and Le Figaro

History 
The Leonard de Vinci Engineering School (ESILV) was created in 1995 by the Conseil général des Hauts-de-Seine. It is an engineering school which is located in La Défense. Since 2003, the diploma of ESILV is a recognized diploma by the Commission des Titres d'Ingénieur (CTI). This accreditation has been renewed in 2013.

Missions 

The ESILV mission is to train professionals in mastering the use of new technologies – particularly the IT tools in advanced applications of design, production, computer communication, and management. The ESILV meets the great challenges of the contemporary world: the evolution of businesses, the globalization and the creation of new professions.

Departments 

The ESILV is composed of four departments:

 Financial engineering
 New energies 
 Computer science
 Computational mechanics 

The majors offered apply in the area of modeling and numerical simulation, computer networks and databases, new energies, new information technologies, computational mechanics, and financial engineering.

Admission 

Students  enter after high school graduation (e.g. French Baccalauréat).  Application is made during the senior year through Concours Avenir. Students may also enter after the Classe Préparatoire aux Grandes Écoles and spend three years in the school or after a Licence and spend two years in the school.

Studies 

Located in the heart of the Parisian business quarter, La Defense, the ESILV is in partnership with several industrial and research institutes.

In today's global economy there is an increasing need for multi-disciplinary engineers who can work cooperatively with their counterparts in overseas organizations. The Engineering School Leonard de Vinci works in partnership with numerous industries, many of which provide potential professional links for its students.

Exchange programs at the graduate and undergraduate levels further expand the educational horizons of the school.  Its teaching philosophy is "learn by doing". ESILV emphasizes the applications of mathematics and computer science that are used in technology and in industry.

There are a wide variety of classes taught at the Engineering School Leonard de Vinci: mathematics, scientific computation, computer science, mechanical engineering and financial engineering to name a few.  In addition, students take classes at the partnering management school EMLV in areas such as marketing and management. For further real-world experience, their curriculum includes two six-month internships with industrial partners.

Since the graduation of the first senior class in July 2000, all of the alumni of the ESILV have successfully joined the work force and were hired as:

Computational Engineer
Design Engineer 
Development Engineer
Testing Engineer
Software Engineer
Production Engineer
Research Engineer
Computer Network Engineer
Trader Engineer
Risk Management Engineer
Security and Exchange Manager
Quantitative Finance Analyst

Thanks to a tailored pedagogy along with the direct contact with today’s industries (projects, internships, numerous instructors coming from the business world), ESILV gives students the opportunity to build their own professional endeavors and profit from the direct contact with the companies of tomorrow.

The Engineering School Leonard de Vinci brings together tomorrow’s realms of research and teaching.

Administration 

 Director: Pascal Pinot
 Director of studies : Remy Sart
 Head of the Department of New Energies: Frédéric Fauberteau
 Head of the Department of Computer Science: Gaël Chareyron 
 Head of the Department of Financial Engineering: Cyril Grunspan
 Head of the Department of Computational Mechanics: Radoin Belaouar

References

External links
Official ESILV−Leonardo da Vinci Engineering School website

Engineering universities and colleges in France
Universities in Île-de-France
La Défense
1992 establishments in France
Educational institutions established in 1992